This timeline of antisemitism chronicles events in the history of antisemitism, hostile actions or discrimination against Jews as members of a religious and/or ethnic group. It includes events in Jewish history and the history of antisemitic thought, actions which were undertaken in order to counter antisemitism or alleviate its effects, and events that affected the prevalence of antisemitism in later years. The history of antisemitism can be traced from ancient times to the present day.

Some authors prefer to use the terms anti-Judaism or religious antisemitism in reference to religious sentiments against Judaism which were prevalent before the rise of racial antisemitism in the 19th century. For events which specifically pertain to expulsions and exoduses of Jews, see Jewish refugees.


Antiquity Century C.E.: 1st2nd3rd 4th5th6th7th 8th9th 10th11th12th 13th14th15th16th 17th18th19th 20th21st

Antiquity 
740 BCE The Assyrian captivity (or the Assyrian exile) is the period in the history of Ancient Israel and Judah during which several thousand Israelites of ancient Samaria were resettled as captives by Assyria. The Northern Kingdom of Israel was conquered by the Neo-Assyrian Empire.

586 BCE During the reign of King Nebuchadnezzar II, the Neo-Babylonian Empire destroys the temple in Jerusalem, and captures the Kingdom of Judah and 10,000 Jewish families.

475 BCE Haman attempts genocide against the Jews. (Purim).

175 BCE–165 BCE The Deuterocanonical First and Second Books of the Maccabees record that Antiochus IV Epiphanes attempts to erect a statue of Zeus in Jerusalem. The festival of Hanukkah commemorates the uprising of the Maccabees against this attempt.

139 BCEGnaeus Cornelius Scipio Hispanus expels all Jews from the city of Rome.

124 BCE The woman with seven sons was a Jewish martyr, described in 2 Maccabees 7 (2 Maccabees was written c. 124 BCE) and other sources. Although unnamed in 2 Maccabees, she is known variously as Hannah, Miriam, and Solomonia. 2 Maccabees states that shortly before the revolt of Judas Maccabeus (2 Maccabees 8), Antiochus IV Epiphanes arrested a mother and her seven sons, and tried to force them to eat pork. When they refused, he tortured and killed the sons one by one. The narrator mentions that the mother "was the most remarkable of all, and deserves to be remembered with special honour. She watched her seven sons die in the space of a single day, yet she bore it bravely because she put her trust in the Lord." Each of the sons makes a speech as he dies, and the last one says that his brothers are "dead under God's covenant of everlasting life". The narrator ends by saying that the mother died, without saying whether she was executed, or died in some other way.

The Talmud tells a similar story, but with the refusal to worship an idol replacing the refusal to eat pork. Tractate Gittin 57b cites Rabbi Judah saying that "this refers to the woman and her seven sons" and the unnamed king is referred to as the "Emperor" and "Caesar". The woman commits suicide in this rendition of the story: she "also went up on to a roof and threw herself down and was killed".

Other versions of the story are found in 4 Maccabees (which suggests that the woman might have thrown herself into the flames, 17:1) and Josippon (which says that she fell dead on her sons' corpses).

63 BCE 12,000 Jews die and many more are sent into the diaspora as a result of Pompey's conquest of the East.

59 BCE Cicero criticizes Jews for being too influential in public assemblies. He also refers to Jews and Syrians as "races born to be slaves."

First century 

19 CE Roman Emperor Tiberius expels Jews from Rome. Their expulsion is recorded by the Roman historical writers Suetonius, Josephus, and Cassius Dio.

38 CE Thousands of Jews killed by mobs in the Alexandrian pogrom, as recounted by Philo of Alexandria in Flaccus. Synagogues are defiled, Jewish leaders are publicly scourged, and the Jewish population is confined to one quarter of the city.

50 CE Jews are ordered by Roman Emperor Claudius "not to hold meetings", in the words of Cassius Dio (Roman History, 60.6.6). Claudius later expelled Jews from Rome, according to both Suetonius ("Lives of the Twelve Caesars", Claudius, Section 25.4) and Acts 18:2.

66 CE Under the command of Tiberius Julius Alexander, Roman soldiers killed about 50,000 Jews in the Alexandria riot.

66–73 CE The First Jewish–Roman War against the Romans is crushed by Vespasian and Titus. Titus refuses to accept a wreath of victory, because there is "no merit in vanquishing people forsaken by their own God." (Philostratus, Vita Apollonii). The events of this period were recorded in detail by the Jewish–Roman historian Josephus. His record is largely sympathetic to the Roman point of view and it was written in Rome under Roman protection; hence it is considered a controversial source. Josephus describes the Jewish revolt as being led by "tyrants," to the detriment of the city, and he describes Titus as having "moderation" in his escalation of the Siege of Jerusalem (70).

70 CE Over 1,000,000 Jews perish and 97,000 are taken as slaves following the destruction of the Second Temple.

73 CE Almost all historical information on Masada is from first-century Jewish Roman historian Josephus. A Roman governor had a legion lay siege to Masada, a mountain fortress. They built a 114 m (375 ft) high assault ramp, during probably two to three months of siege, and then breached the fortress with a battering ram on 16 April. According to Josephus, presumably based upon Roman commander commentaries accessible to him, when Romans entered the fortress they found its defendants had set all buildings but food storerooms ablaze and committed mass suicide or killed each other, 960 men, women, and children in total. Israel Defense Forces (IDF) Chief of staff, Moshe Dayan, began having the swearing-in ceremony of Armoured Corps soldiers on top of Masada, ending with, "Masada shall not fall again.".

94 CE Fabrications of Apion in Alexandria, Egypt, including the first recorded case of blood libel. Juvenal writes anti-Jewish poetry. Josephus picks apart contemporary and old antisemitic myths in his work Against Apion.

96 CE Titus Flavius Clemens, nephew of the Roman Emperor Vespasian and supposed convert to Judaism is put to death on charges of atheism.

100 CE Tacitus writes anti-Jewish polemic in his Histories (book 5). He reports on several old myths of ancient antisemitism (including that of the donkey's head in the Holy of Holies), but the key to his view that Jews "regard the rest of mankind with all the hatred of enemies" is his analysis of the extreme differences between monotheistic Judaism and the polytheism common throughout the Roman world.

Second century 

115–117 Thousands of Jews are killed during civil unrest in Egypt, Cyprus, and Cyrenaica, as recounted by Cassius Dio.

119 Roman Emperor Hadrian bans circumcision, making Judaism de facto illegal.

132–135 Crushing of the Bar Kokhba revolt. According to Cassius Dio 580,000 Jews are killed. Hadrian orders the expulsion of Jews from Judea, which is merged with Galilee in order to form the province of Syria Palaestina. The purpose of this name change was to suppress the Jewish people's connection to their historic homeland (Judea / Land of Israel). (For other antisemitic actions resulting from this name change, see events of 1967 below) Although large Jewish populations remain in Samaria and Galilee, with Tiberias as the headquarters of exiled Jewish patriarchs, this is the start of the Jewish diaspora. Hadrian constructs a pagan temple to Jupiter at the site of the Temple in Jerusalem, builds Aelia Capitolina among the ruins of Jerusalem.

136 Hadrian renames Jerusalem to Aelia Capitolina and builds a Roman monument over the site of the Temple Mount. Jews are banned from visiting. Judea is renamed Palestine to suppress the Jewish connection with the land.

167 Earliest known accusation of Jewish deicide (the notion that Jews were held responsible for the death of Jesus), made in a sermon On the Passover, attributed to Melito of Sardis.

175 Apollinaris the Apologist writes two books against the Jews.

Third century 
212 Emperor Caracalla allows all Jewish men within the Roman Empire to become full Roman citizens.

259 The Jewish community of Nehardea is destroyed.

Fourth century 
306 The Synod of Elvira bans intermarriage between Christians and Jews. Other social intercourses, such as eating together, are also forbidden.

315 Constantine I enacts various laws regarding the Jews: Jews are not allowed to own Christian slaves or to circumcise their slaves. Conversion of Christians to Judaism is outlawed. Congregations for religious services are restricted, but Jews are also allowed to enter the restituted Jerusalem on the anniversary of the Temple's destruction.

325 Jews are expelled and banned from Jerusalem.

325 First Ecumenical Council of Nicaea. The Christian Church separates the calculation of the date of Easter from the Jewish Passover: "It was ... declared improper to follow the custom of the Jews in the celebration of this holy festival, because, their hands having been stained with crime, the minds of these wretched men are necessarily blinded.... Let us, then, have nothing in common with the Jews, who are our adversaries. ... avoiding all contact with that evil way. ... who, after having compassed the death of the Lord, being out of their minds, are guided not by sound reason, but by an unrestrained passion, wherever their innate madness carries them. ... a people so utterly depraved. ... Therefore, this irregularity must be corrected, in order that we may no more have any thing in common with those parricides and the murderers of our Lord. ... no single point in common with the perjury of the Jews."

330 Rabbah bar Nahmani is forced to flee to the forest where he dies.

339 Intermarriage between Christians and Jews is banned in the Roman Empire, declaring the punishment death.

351 Book burning of Jewish texts in Persia.

351–352 Jewish revolt against Constantius Gallus. Jews rise up against the corrupt rule of Gallus. Many towns are destroyed, thousands are killed.

353 Constantius II institutes a law stating that any Christian who converts to Judaism will have their property confiscated.

361 Roman Emperor Julian the Apostate, allows the Jews to return to "Holy Jerusalem which you have for many years longed to see rebuilt" and to rebuild the Temple.

380 St. Gregory of Nysa calls Jews "murders of the Lord, assassins of the prophets, rebels and detesters of God, companions of the devils, a race of vipers."

386 John Chrysostom of Antioch writes eight homilies called Adversus Judaeos (lit: Against the Judaizers). See also: Christianity and antisemitism.

388 1 August: A Christian mob incited by the local bishop plunders and burns down a synagogue in Callinicum. Theodosius I orders that those responsible be punished, and the synagogue is rebuilt at the Christians' expense. Ambrose of Milan insists in his letter that the whole case be dropped. He interrupts the liturgy in the emperor's presence with an ultimatum that he will not continue until the case is dropped. Theodosius complies.

399 The Western Roman Emperor Honorius calls Judaism superstitio indigna and confiscates gold and silver collected by the synagogues for Jerusalem.

Fifth century 
408 Roman laws pass which prohibit Jews from setting fire to Haman, stating that they are mocking Christianity.

415 A Jewish uprising in Alexandria claims the lives of many Christians. Bishop Cyril forces his way into the synagogue, expels the Jews (some authors estimate the numbers of Jews expelled up to 100 thousand) and gives their property to the mob. Later, near Antioch, Jews are accused of ritual murder during Purim. Christians confiscate the synagogue. Jews call it "415 C.E. Alexandria Expulsion".

415 An edict issued by the Emperors Honorius and Theodosius II ban building new Synagogues and converting non-Jews to Judaism.

418 The first record of Jews being forced to convert or face expulsion. Bishop Severus of Menorca, claimed to have forced 540 Jews to accept Christianity upon conquering the island. The synagogue in Magona, now Port Mahon the capital of Menorca, is burned.

419 The monk Barsauma (not to be confused with the famous Bishop of Nisibis) gathers a group of followers and for the next three years, he destroys synagogues throughout the province of Palestine.

425 The final nasi of the ancient Sanhedrin Gamliel VI is executed by the Roman Empire. This subsequently ended the Jewish patriarchate.

429 The East Roman Emperor Theodosius II orders that all funds raised by Jews to support their schools be turned over to his treasury.

438 Theodosius II's wife visits Jerusalem, and arranges for Jews to visit and pray at the ruins of the Temple Mount. This leads to Jews emigrating to Jerusalem, where some are killed after being stabbed and stoned by local monks. At the trial for the deaths the monks claimed that the stones fell from heaven and thus they were acquitted.

439 The Codex Theodosianus, the first imperial compilation of laws. Jews are prohibited from holding important positions involving money, including judicial and executive offices. The ban against building new synagogues is reinstated. The anti-Jewish statutes also apply to the Samaritans. The Code is also accepted by Western Roman Emperor, Valentinian III.

451 Sassanid ruler Yazdegerd II of Persia's decree abolishes the Sabbath and orders executions of Jewish leaders, including the Exilarch Mar Nuna.

465 Council of Vannes, Gaul prohibited the Christian clergy from participating in Jewish feasts.

469 Half of the Jewish population of Isfahan is put to death and their children are brought up as 'fire-worshippers' over the alleged killing of two Magi Priests.

470Exilarch Huna V is executed as a result of persecution under King Peroz (Firuz) of Persia.

Sixth century 
502 After the Jews of Babylon revolt and gain a short period of independence, the Persian King Kobad crucifies the Exilarch Mar-Zutra II on the bridge of Mahoza.

506 Synagogue of Daphne is destroyed and its inhabitants are massacred by a Christian mob celebrating the result of a chariot race.

517 Christians are banned from participating in Jewish feasts as a result of the Council of Epaone.

519 Ravenna, Italy. After the local synagogues were burned down by the local mob, the Ostrogothic king Theodoric the Great orders the town to rebuild them at its own expense.

529–559 Byzantine Emperor Justinian the Great publishes Corpus Juris Civilis. New laws restrict citizenship to Christians. These regulations determined the status of Jews throughout the Empire for hundreds of years: Jewish civil rights restricted: "they shall enjoy no honors". The principle of Servitus Judaeorum (Servitude of the Jews) is established: the Jews cannot testify against Christians. The emperor becomes an arbiter in internal Jewish matters. The use of the Hebrew language in worship is forbidden. Shema Yisrael ("Hear, O Israel, the Lord is one"), sometimes considered the most important prayer in Judaism, is banned as a denial of the Trinity. Some Jewish communities are converted by force, their synagogues turned into churches.

531 Emperor Justinian rules that Jews cannot testify against Christians. Jewish liturgy is censored for being "anti-trinitarian."

535 Synagogue of Borion is closed and all Jewish practices are prohibited by order of Justinian.

535 The First Council of Clermont (of Gaul) prohibits Jews from holding public office.

538 The Third Council of Orléans (of Gaul) forbids Jews to employ Christian servants or possess Christian slaves. Jews are prohibited from appearing in the streets during Easter: "their appearance is an insult to Christianity". A Merovingian king Childebert approves the measure.

547 Jews and Samaritans of Caesarea are massacred after revolting.

576 Clermont, Gaul. Bishop Avitus offers Jews a choice: accept Christianity or leave Clermont. Most emigrate to Marseilles.

582 The Merovingians order that all Jews of the Kingdom are to be baptized.

589 The Council of Narbonne, Septimania, forbids Jews from chanting psalms while burying their dead. Anyone violating this law is fined 6 ounces of gold. The third Council of Toledo, held under Visigothic King Reccared, bans Jews from slave ownership and holding positions of authority, and reiterates the mutual ban on intermarriage. Reccared also rules children out of such marriages to be raised as Christians.

590 Pope Gregory I defends the Jews against forced conversion.

590–591 The Exilarch Haninai is executed by Khosrau II for supporting Mihrevandak. This halted all forms of Jewish self-governance for over 50 years.

592 The entire Jewish population of Antioch is punished because a Jew violated a law.

598 Bishop Victor of Palermo seizes the local synagogues and repurposes them into churches.

Seventh century 
608–610 Massacres of Jews all across the Byzantine Empire.

610–620 After many of his anti-Jewish edicts were ignored, King Sisebur prohibits Judaism in Hispania and Septimania. Those not baptized fled. This was the first incidence where a prohibition of Judaism affected an entire country. 

614 Fifth Council of Paris decrees that all Jews holding military or civil positions must accept baptism, together with their families.

614–617 The Jewish revolt against Heraclius. The last serious attempt to gain Jewish autonomy in the Land of Israel prior to modern times.

615 Italy. The earliest referral to the Juramentum Judaeorum (the Jewish Oath): the concept that no heretic could be believed in court against a Christian. The oath became standardized throughout Europe in 1555.

617 After breaking their promise of Jewish autonomy in Jerusalem, the Persians forbid Jews from settling within three miles of the city.

624 Mohammed watches as 600 Jews are decapitated in Medina in one day.

626–627 The Council of Clichy declared that any Jew who accepts public office must convert.

627 93 Jews are killed in the Battle of Khaybar.

629 Byzantine Emperor Heraclius with his army marches into Jerusalem. Jewish inhabitants support him after his promise of amnesty. Upon his entry into Jerusalem the local priests convince him that killing Jews is a good deed. The only Jews that survived were the ones who fled to Egypt or the mountains.

629
Frankish King Dagobert I, encouraged by Byzantine Emperor Heraclius, expels all Jews from the kingdom.

632 The first case of officially sanctioned forced baptism. Emperor Heraclius violates the Codex Theodosianus, which protected them from forced conversions.

634–641 Jews living in the Levant are forced to pay the Jizya as a result of the Muslim conquest of the Levant

640 Jews expelled from Arabia.

642 The Jizya is imposed on the native Jews of Egypt, Cyrenaica, Tripolitania and Fezzan.

653 The Jews of Toledo are forced to convert or be expelled.

681 The Twelfth Council of Toledo enacts antisemitic laws.

682 Visigothic king Erwig begins his reign by enacting 28 anti-Jewish laws. He presses for the "utter extirpation of the pest of the Jews" and decrees that all converts must be registered by a parish priest, who must issue travel permits. All holidays, Christian and Jewish, must be spent in the presence of a priest to ensure piety and to prevent the backsliding.

692 Quinisext Council in Constantinople forbids Christians on pain of excommunication to bathe in public baths with Jews, employ a Jewish doctor or socialize with Jews.

694 17th Council of Toledo. King Ergica believes rumors that the Jews had conspired to ally themselves with the Muslim invaders and forces Jews to give all land, slaves and buildings bought from Christians, to his treasury. He declares that all Jewish children over the age of seven should be taken from their homes and raised as Christians.

Eighth century 
717 Possible date for the Pact of Umar, a document that specified restrictions on Jews and Christians (dhimmi) living under Muslim rule. However, academic historians believe that this document was actually compiled at a much later date.

720 Caliph Omar II bans Jewish worship on the Temple Mount.

722 Byzantine emperor Leo III forcibly converts all Jews and Montanists in the empire into mainstream Byzantine Christianity.

740 First Archbishop of York Ecgbert bans Christians from eating with Jews.

787 Empress Irena decries the practice of forced conversion against Jews.

788 Idriss I attacks Jewish communities, imposes high per capita taxes, and forces them to provide annual virgins for his harem for refusing to attack other Jewish communities. According to Maghrebi tradition, the Jewish tribe Ubaid Allah left and settled in Djerba.

Ninth century 
807 Abbasid Caliph Harun al-Rashid orders all Jews in the Caliphate to wear a yellow belt, with Christians to wear a blue one.

820 Agobard, Archbishop of Lyons, declares in his essays that Jews are accursed and demands a complete segregation of Christians and Jews. In 826 he issues a series of pamphlets to convince Emperor Louis the Pious to attack "Jewish insolence", but fails to convince the Emperor.

850 Al-Mutawakkil decrees that Dhimmi — Jews and Christians — wear garments to distinguish them from Muslims, that their places of worship be destroyed with demonic effigies nailed to the door, and that they be allowed little involvement in government or official matters.

870 Ahmad ibn Tulun flattens Jewish cemeteries and replaces them with Muslim tombs.

874Basil I decrees that all Byzantine Jews are to be baptized, by force if necessary.

878–879 Around 120,000–200,000 foreign merchants (including Jews, Muslim Arabs, Muslim Persians, Zoroastrian Persians, and Christians) are slaughtered in Guangzhou, China.

884 Basil I reinforces law that prohibits Jews from holding any civil or military position in Epanagoge.

888 Church council in Metz forbids Christians and Jews from eating together.

897 Charles the Simple donates all Jewish owned land to the Bishop of Narbonne. There is no recourse against the action.

Tenth century  

900–929 French king Charles the Simple confiscates Jewish-owned property in Narbonne and donates it to the Church.

925 Jews of Oria are raided by a Muslim mob during a series of attacks on Italy. At least ten rabbinical leaders and many more are taken as captives. Among those captured is 12-year-old Shabbetai Donnolo, who would go on later to be a famous physician and astronomer.

931 Bishop Ratherius of Verona begs the town elders to expel the Jews from the city until they agree to temporarily expel them.

931–942 Romanos I Lekapenos decreed that all Jews should be forced to convert and subjugated if they refuse. This leads to the death of hundreds of Jews and the destruction of numerous synagogues.

932 The Jewish quarter of Bari, Italy is destroyed by a mob and a number of Jews are killed.

943–944 Byzantine Jews from all over the Empire flee from persecution into Khazaria. The King of Khazaria at the time, who was Jewish, subsequently cut ties with the Byzantine Empire.

945Venice bans Jews from using Venetian vessels.

985 Entire Jewish population of Sparta is expelled after Nikon the Metanoeite says it will rid the city of a plague.

985 A number of Jewish residents in Barcelona are killed by the Muslim leader Almanzor. All Jewish owned land is handed over to the Count of Barcelona.

Eleventh century 
1008 Caliph Al-Hakim bi-Amr Allah ("the Mad") issues severe restrictions against Jews in the Fatimid Empire. All Jews are forced to wear a heavy wooden "golden calf" around their necks. Christians had to wear a large wooden cross and members of both groups had to wear black hats.

1009 Caliph Abu Ali-Mansur orders the destruction of synagogues, Torah scrolls and Jewish artifacts among other non-Muslim buildings.

1010 The Jews of Ligomes are given the choice of baptism or exile.

1011 The Abbasid Caliph Al-Qadir publishes the Baghdad Manifesto, which accuses the Fatimids of being descended from Jews, instead of being "family of the prophet."

1011 A Muslim mob attacks a Jewish funeral procession, resulting in the arrest of 23 Jews.

1011 Pogrom against Sephardic Jews in Córdoba by a Muslim mob.

1012 One of the first known persecutions of Jews in Germany: Henry II, Holy Roman Emperor expels Jews from Mainz.

1013 During the fall of the city, Sulayman's troops looted Córdoba and massacred citizens of the city, including many Jews. Prominent Jews in Córdoba, such as Samuel ibn Naghrela were forced to flee to the city in 1013.

1016 The Jewish community of Kairouan, Tunisia is forced to choose between conversion and expulsion.

1021 A violent earthquake occurs, which some Greeks maintain is caused by a desecration of Jesus by the Jews. For this a number of Roman Jews are burnt at the stake.

1026 Probable date of the chronicle of Raoul Glaber. The French chronicler blamed the Jews for the destruction of the Church of the Holy Sepulchre, which was destroyed in 1009 by (Muslim) Caliph Al-Hakim. As a result, Jews were expelled from Limoges and other French towns.

1032 Abul Kamal Tumin conquers Fez, Morocco and decimates the Jewish community, killing 6,000 Jews.

1033 Following their conquest of the city from the Maghrawa tribe, the forces of Tamim, chief of the Zenata Berber Banu Ifran tribe, perpetrated a massacre of Jews in Fez. Fez massacre

1035 Sixty Jews are put to death in Castrojeriz during a revolt, because the Jews were considered "property" of the kingdom by the locals.

1039 A Muslim mob raids the palace of the Jewish vizier and kills him after the ruler al-Mondhir is assassinated.

1040 Exilarch Hezekiah Gaon is imprisoned and tortured to death by the Buyyids. The death of Hezekiah ended the line of the Geonim, which had begun four centuries earlier.

1050 Council of Narbonne, France forbids Christians to live in Jewish homes.

1066 Granada massacre: Muslim mob stormed the royal palace in Granada, crucified Jewish vizier Joseph ibn Naghrela and massacred most of the Jewish population of the city. "More than 1,500 Jewish families, numbering 4,000 persons, fell in one day."

1071 Jerusalem falls to the Seljuk Turks, many synagogues are destroyed and life for Jews in Jerusalem becomes much more restricted.

1078 Council of Girona decrees Jews to pay taxes for support of the Catholic Church to the same extent as Christians.

1090 The Jewish community of Granada, which had recovered after the attacks of 1066, attacked again at the hands of the Almoravides led by Yusuf ibn Tashfin, bringing the golden age of Jewish culture in Spain to end.

1092 Jews are prohibited from working on Sunday or marrying Christians as a result of the Synod of Szabolcs.

1096 The First Crusade. Three hosts of crusaders pass through several Central European cities. The third, unofficial host, led by Count Emicho, decides to attack the Jewish communities, most notably in the Rhineland, under the slogan: "Why fight Christ's enemies abroad when they are living among us?" Eimicho's host attacks the synagogue at Speyer and kills all the defenders. 800 are killed in Worms. Another 1,200 Jews commit suicide in Mainz to escape his attempt to forcibly convert them (see German Crusade, 1096), and 600 are massacred in Mainz on 27 May. Attempts by the local bishops remained fruitless. All in all, 5,000 Jews were murdered.

1099 Jews fight side by side with Muslim soldiers to defend Jerusalem against the Crusaders and face massacres when it falls. According to the Muslim chronicle of Ibn al-Qalanisi, "The Jews assembled in their synagogue, and the Franks burned it over their heads." However, a contemporary Jewish communication does not corroborate the report that Jews were actually inside of the Synagogue when it was set on fire. This letter was discovered among the Cairo Geniza collection in 1975 by historian Shelomo Dov Goitein. Historians believe that it was written just two weeks after the siege, making it "the earliest account on the conquest in any language." However, all sources agree that a synagogue was indeed burned during the siege.

Twelfth century 
1106 Son of Yusuf ibn Tashfin decrees the death penalty for any Jews living in Marrakesh.

1107 Moroccan Almoravid ruler Yusuf ibn Tashfin ordered all Moroccan Jews to convert or leave.

1108 Many Jews are massacred and their houses and synagogues are burned following a Muslim victory at the Battle of Uclés (1108). Of those murdered is Solomon ibn Farissol, the leader of the Castile community. This incident greatly impacted the Hebrew poet Judah HaLevi, and completely shifted the focus of his poetry.

1113 Upon the death of Sviatopolk II, leader of the Kievan Rus', widespread riots and plundering of Jewish homes commenced.

1124 The Jewish Quarter of Kiev is destroyed by arson.

1135 A Muslim mob in Córdoba storms into Jewish homes, takes their possessions and kills a number of them.

1141 During the fight for succession between Matilde and Stephen (The Anarchy), the Jews of Oxford are forced to pay ransom to both sides of the conflict or their houses are to be burned.

1143 150 Jews are killed in Ham, France.

1144 The case of William of Norwich, a contrived accusation of murder by Jews in Norwich, England.

1145 Abd al-Mu'min gives the Jewish population of Sijilmasa the choice of converting to Islam or death. At least 150 Jews who refuse to convert are massacred.

1146 100,000 Jews are massacred by the Almohads in Fez, Morocco and 120,000 in Marrakesh.

1147 Jews are expelled from Muslim Spain.

1148 The mostly-Jewish town Lucena is captured by the Almohads. The local Jews are given the choice of Islam or death. This was the end of the Jewish community of Lucena.

1148–1212 The rule of the Almohads in al-Andalus. Only Jews who had converted to Christianity or Islam were allowed to live in Granada. One of the refugees was Maimonides, who settled in Fez and later in Fustat near Cairo.

1160 Appalled by the annual practice of beating Jews during Palm Sunday, Bishop William issues an order which would excommunicate any priest who continues the practice.

1165 Forced mass conversions in Yemen.

1165 New Almohad ruler decrees that all Jews in Fez must convert to Islam or face death. Judah ha-Kohen ibn Shushan is burnt alive for refusing, and famous Rabbi Maimonides is displaced and permanently leaves for Egypt.

1168 Harold of Gloucester is found floating in a river. The local Benedictine monks use the discovery to claim that "the child had been spirited away by the Jews on the 21st February for them to torture him to death on the night of 16th March". It established that the mythology created around William's death could be used as a template for explaining later deaths.

1171 In Blois, France 31 Jews were burned at the stake for blood libel.

1171 Jews of Bologna are expelled for no known reason.

1173 Following multiple church-inspired riots against the Jews of Poland, Mieszko III forbids all kinds of violence against the Jews.

1177 King Alfonso II, Spain, creates a charter which defines the status of Jews in Teruel. Jews are defined as "slaves of the king, belonging entirely to the royal treasury." The fee for killing a Jew is half of what the fee is for killing a Christian, and is to be paid directly to the king (since Jews are considered property of the crown).

1179 The Third Lateran Council, Canon 26: Jews are forbidden to be plaintiffs or witnesses against Christians in the courts. Jews are forbidden to withhold inheritance from descendants who had accepted Christianity.

1179 The body of a Christian girl is found near the shore. The Jews of Boppard are blamed for her death, resulting in 13 Jews being murdered.

1180 Philip Augustus of France after four months in power, imprisons all the Jews in his lands and demands a ransom for their release.

1181 Philip Augustus annuls all loans made by Jews to Christians and takes a percentage for himself. A year later, he confiscates all Jewish property and expels the Jews from Paris.

1181 The Assize of Arms of 1181 orders that all weapons held by Jews must be confiscated, claiming they have no use for them. This led to the Jewish community of England being a lot more vulnerable during Anti-Jewish riots.

1182 Jews are expelled from Orléans.

1184 Jewish martyr Elhanan, the son of Ri is murdered for refusing to convert.

1188 The Saladin tithe. Jews are taxed 25% of their income and personal worth, while Christians are taxed 10%.

1189 Holy Roman Emperor Frederick I Barbarossa orders priests not to preach against Jews.

1189 A Jewish deputation attending coronation of Richard the Lionheart was attacked by the crowd. Pogroms in London followed and spread around England.

1190 All the Jews of Norwich, England found in their houses were slaughtered, except a few who found refuge in the castle.

1190 57 Jews in St. Edmunds are killed in a massacre on Palm Sunday.

1190 500 Jews of York were massacred after a six-day siege by departing Crusaders, backed by a number of people indebted to Jewish money-lenders.

1190 Saladdin takes over Jerusalem from Crusaders and lifts the ban for Jews to live there.

1191 More than 80 Jews in Bray-sur-Seine are burned at the stake after trying to execute a murderer who had killed an Israelite.

1195 After falsely being accused of ritual murder with no evidence, the daughter of Rabbi Isaac bar Asher ha-Levi is murdered, dismembered and her body parts are hung around the market place for days. Ha-Levi was killed the following day along with 8 other Jews after trying to recover what was left of his daughter's body from the mob.

1197 In an attempt to isolate the Jewish population economically, Christians were barred from buying food from Jews or having conversations with them under the threat of excommunication.

1198 Philip Augustus readmits Jews to Paris, only after another ransom was paid and a taxation scheme was set up to procure funds for himself. August: Saladdin's nephew al-Malik, caliph of Yemen, summons all the Jews and forcibly converts them.

Thirteenth century 

13th century Germany. Appearance of Judensau: obscene and dehumanizing imagery of Jews, ranging from etchings to Cathedral ceilings. Its popularity lasted for over 600 years.

1203 Jewish quarter of Constantinople is burned down by crusaders during the Siege of Constantinople (1203).

1204 In 1204 the papacy required Jews to segregate themselves from Christians and to wear distinctive clothing.

1205 Jews are expelled from villages and towns all around Spain by Muslims.

1206 Jewish homes are burned, looted, Israelites are killed and the remaining Jewish population of Halle is expelled.

1209 Béziers is stormed and its inhabitants are massacred. Among those were 200 Jews. All Jewish children who survived and didn't flee were forcibly baptized.

1209 Raymond VI, Count of Toulouse, humiliated and forced to swear that he would implement social restrictions against Jews.

1210 King John of England imprisoned much of the Jewish population until they paid up 66,000 marks.

1212 Forced conversions and mass murder of the Jewish community of Toledo.

1215 The Fourth Lateran Council headed by Pope Innocent III declares: "Jews and Saracens of both sexes in every Christian province and at all times shall be marked off in the eyes of the public from other peoples through the character of their dress." (Canon 68). See Judenhut. The Fourth Lateran Council also noted that the Jews' own law required the wearing of identifying symbols. Pope Innocent III also reiterated papal injunctions against forcible conversions, and added: "No Christian shall do the Jews any personal injury...or deprive them of their possessions...or disturb them during the celebration of their festivals...or extort money from them by threatening to exhume their dead."

1217 French noblewoman Alix de Montmorency imprisons the Jewish population of Toulouse for refusing to convert. She eventually released them all except for children under six, who were taken and adopted by Christians.

1221 An anti-Jewish riot erupts in Erfurt, where the Jewish quarter is destroyed along with two synagogues. Around 26 Jews are killed, and others throw themselves into fire rather than be forcibly converted. Samuel of Speyer was among those martyred.

1222 Council of Oxford: Archbishop of Canterbury Stephen Langton forbids Jews from building new synagogues, owning slaves or mixing with Christians.

1223 Louis VIII of France prohibits his officials from recording debts owed to Jews, reversing his father's policy of seeking such debts.

1227 The Synod of Narbonne reaffirms the anti-Semitic decrees of the Fourth Lateran Council.

1229 Raymond VII, Count of Toulouse, heir of Raymond VI, also forced to swear that he would implement social restrictions against Jews.

1229 Treaty of Jaffa is signed between Frederick II and the Sultan Al-Kamil of Egypt. Jews are once again banned from residing in Jerusalem.

1230 Theodore Komnenos Doukas is defeated. Since Theodore decreed many anti-Jewish laws and seized Jewish property, he was handed over to two Jews by John Asen II to personally kill him. After having pity on him and refusing to kill Theodore, the Czar had the Jews thrown off a cliff.

1232 Forced mass conversions in Marrakesh, over 1,000 Moroccan Jews are killed.

1235 The Jews of Fulda, Germany were accused of ritual murder. To investigate the blood libel, Emperor Frederick II held a special conference of Jewish converts to Christianity at which the converts were questioned about Jewish ritual practice. Letters inviting prominent individuals to the conference still survive. At the conference, the converts stated unequivocally that Jews do not harm Christian children or require blood for any rituals. In 1236 the Emperor published these findings and in 1247 Pope Innocent IV, the Emperor's enemy, also denounced accusations of the ritual murder of Christian children by Jews. In 1272, the papal repudiation of the blood libel was repeated by Pope Gregory X, who also ruled that thereafter any such testimony of a Christian against a Jew could not be accepted unless it is confirmed by another Jew. Unfortunately, these proclamations from the highest sources were not effective in altering the beliefs of the Christian majority and the libels continued.

1236 Crusaders attack Jewish communities of Anjou and Poitou and attempt to baptize all the Jews. Those who resisted (est. 3,000) were slaughtered.

1236 A Jew and a Christian fisherman get into a heated argument about prices, which turns physical. It ends when the Jew deals a devastating blow to the Gentile's head which leads to his death. This enrages the local Christian population, who attack the Jewish quarter of Narbonne. Don Aymeric, the governor of Narbonne prevents a massacre and restores all stolen Jewish property to their rightful owner.

1240 Duke Jean le Roux expels Jews from Brittany.

1240 Disputation of Paris. Pope Gregory IX puts Talmud on trial on the charges that it contains blasphemy against Jesus and Mary and attacks on the Church.

1241 A pogrom against the Jews of Frankfurt takes place after conflicts over Jewish-Christian marriages and the enforced baptism of interfaith couples. 180 Jews are killed as a result and 24 agree to be baptized. This became known as the Judenschlacht (German for Slaughter of the Jews).

1241 In England, first of a series of royal levies against Jewish finances, which forced the Jews to sell their debts to non-Jews at cut prices.

1242 Following a show trial, the Talmud is "convicted" of corrupting the Jews. 24 cart-loads of hand-written Talmudic manuscripts, some 10,000 volumes and comprising most of the extant volumes in France, are burned in the streets of Paris.

1242 James I of Aragon orders Jews to listen to conversion sermons and to attend churches. Friars are given power to enter synagogues uninvited.

1243 The first ever accusation of Host Desecration. The entire Jewish population of Beelitz was burned at the stake after being accused of torturing Jesus and the spot it happened was named "Judenberg."

1243 11 Jews are tortured to death following a blood libel in Kitzingen Germany.

1244 Pope Innocent IV orders Louis IX of France to burn all Talmud copies.

1249 Alphonse of Poitiers orders the expulsion of all Jews in Poitou.

1250 Saragossa Spain: death of a choirboy Saint Dominguito del Val prompts ritual murder accusation. His sainthood was revoked in the 20th century but reportedly a chapel dedicated to him still exists in the Cathedral of Saragossa.

1253 Henry III of England introduces harsh anti-Jewish laws.

1254 Louis IX expels the Jews from France, their property and synagogues confiscated. Most move to Germany and further east, however, after a couple of years, some were readmitted back.

1255 Henry III of England sells his rights to the Jews (regarded as royal "chattels") to his brother Richard for 5,000 marks.

1257 The Badge of shame is imposed locally on the Italian Jews.

1260 Mongols are defeated and Syria is brought under Mamluk rule. Anti-Jewish laws are once again decreed, and Jewish life becomes a lot more restricted in the Levant.

1260 Jews are banned from ascending above the 7th step on the Cave of the Patriarchs. This ban would last 700 years.

1260 Thomas Aquinas publishes Summa Contra Gentiles, a summary of Christian faith to be presented to those who reject it. The Jews who refuse to convert are regarded as "deliberately defiant" rather than "invincibly ignorant".

1263 Disputation of Barcelona.

1264 Pope Clement IV assigns Talmud censorship committee.

1264 Simon de Montfort inspires massacre of Jews in London.

1265 German-Jewish convert Abraham of Augsburg publicly assails Christianity, severs the heads of crucifix figurines and is sentenced to torture and death by burning.

1267 In a special session, the Vienna city council forces Jews to wear Pileum cornutum (a cone-shaped headdress, prevalent in many medieval illustrations of Jews). This distinctive dress is an addition to Yellow badge Jews were already forced to wear. Christians are not permitted to attend Jewish ceremonies.

1267 Synod of Breslau orders Jews to live in a segregated quarter.

1267 After an accusation from an old woman that the Jews had bought a Christian child from her to kill, the entire Jewish community of Pforzheim face massacres and expulsion. Rabbi Samuel ben Yaḳar ha-Levi, Rabbi Isaac ben Eliezer and Rabbi Abraham ben Gershom commit suicide to escape the cruel torture they feared.

1275 King Edward I of England passes the Statute of the Jewry forcing Jews over the age of seven to wear an identifying yellow badge, and making usury illegal, in order to seize their assets. Scores of English Jews are arrested, 300 hanged and their property goes to the Crown. In 1280 he orders Jews to be present as Dominicans preach conversion. In 1287 he arrests heads of Jewish families and demands their communities pay ransom of 12,000 pounds.

1276 Massacre in Fez to kill all Jews stopped by intervention of the Emir

1278 The Edict of Pope Nicholas III requires compulsory attendance of Jews at conversion sermons.

1279 Synod of Ofen: Christians are forbidden to sell or rent real estate to or from Jews.

1282 John Pectin, Archbishop of Canterbury, orders all London synagogues to close and prohibits Jewish physicians from practicing on Christians.

1283 Philip III of France causes mass migration of Jews by forbidding them to live in the small rural localities.

1283 10 Jews are slain in Mainz after claims of blood libel.

1285 Blood libel in Munich, Germany results in the death of 68 Jews. 180 more Jews are burned alive at the synagogue.

1287 A 16-year-old boy is found dead in the Rhine. Immediately the Jews of Oberwesel are accused of killing the boy. Over 40 men, women and children were killed by rioters as a response.

1287 Jews are arrested and accused of coin clippage. Even without evidence, the whole community is convicted and expelled.

1288 The Jewish population of Troyes is accused of ritual murder. 13 Jewish martyrs are burned at the stake, sacrificing themselves to spare the rest of the community.

1288 104 Jews in Bonn, Germany are killed during a pogrom.

1289 Jews are expelled from Gascony and Anjou.

1290 Edict of Expulsion: Edward I expels all Jews from England, allowing them to take only what they could carry, all the other property became the Crown's. Official reason: continued practice of usury.

1290 A Jewish man named Jonathan and his wife are accused of stabbing the wafer to torture Jesus. They are both burned at the stake, their house is destroyed and replaced with a chapel.

1290 The Jews of Baghdad are massacred. 

1290 18 July Edward I of England issues Edict of Expulsion, decreeing all Jews to be expelled from England.

1291 Philip the Fair publishes an ordinance prohibiting the Jews to settle in France.

1291 Jewish physician and grand vizier Sa'ad al-Dawla is killed by Muslims who felt it a degradation to have a Jew placed over them. Persian Jews suffer a long-period of violent persecution by the Muslim population.

1292 Forced conversion and expulsion of the Italian Jewish community.

1298 Accusations of Host desecration against the German Jews. More than 140 Jewish communities face forced conversions.

1298 During the civil war between Adolph of Nassau and Albrecht of Austria, German knight Rintfleisch claims to have received a mission from heaven to exterminate "the accursed race of the Jews". Under his leadership, the mob goes from town to town destroying Jewish communities and massacring about 100,000 Jews, often by mass burning at stake. Among 146 localities in Franconia, Bavaria and Austria are Röttingen (20 April), Würzburg (24 July), Nuremberg (1 August).

Fourteenth century 
1301 Riots break out in Egypt, which are encouraged by the Mamluks. Many Jews are forcibly converted to Islam, including the entire Jewish population of Bilbeis. Many synagogues are appropriated into mosques.

1305 Philip IV of France seizes all Jewish property (except the clothes they wear) and expels them from France (approx. 100,000). His successor Louis X of France allows French Jews to return in 1315.

1306 Jews of Sens, Yonne department of France, are expelled. This was the third and final expulsion (after those in 876 and 1198). 

1306 Jews expelled from Castelsarrasin, France. 

1310 Frederick II of Aragon adopts anti-Jewish laws, which require them to mark their clothes and shops with the yellow badge. Jews were also forbidden from having any relationship with Catholics.

1318 Rashid-al-Din Hamadani, a Persian Jewish convert to Islam was executed on fake charges of poisoning Öljeitü and for several days crowds carried his head around his native city of Tabriz, chanting "This is the head of the Jew who abused the name of God; may God's curse be upon him!"

1319 Jews are expelled from Breslau.

1320 Jews are expelled from Milan during a persecution of so-called heretics.

1320 152 Jews massacred in Castelsarrasin, France. 

1320 Shepherds' Crusade attacks the Jews of 120 localities in southwest France.

1321 King Henry II of Castile forces Jews to wear Yellow badge.

1321 Jews in central France accused of ordering lepers to poison wells. After massacre of est. 5,000 Jews, King Philip V admits they were innocent.

1321 A Muslim mob destroys a synagogue in Damascus.

1322 King Charles IV expels Jews from France.

1328 5,000 Jews are massacred and their houses are burned down following anti-Jewish preaching by a Franciscan friar.

1328 Jewish martyr Aaron ben Zerah, along with his wife and four of his sons are executed.

1333 Forced mass conversions in Baghdad

1336 Persecutions against Jews in Franconia and Alsace led by lawless German bands, the Armleder under the highwayman Arnold von Uissigheim. Roughly 1500 Jews are killed.

1336 The Aleinu prayer is banned in Castile.

1337 Host desecration accusations. Violence spreads to over 51 Jewish communities.

1338 Pogroms over host desecration in Wolfsberg. The Jews are accused of stealing the bread of the Eucharist and trying to burn it. Over 70 Jews are burned at the stake and the entire Jewish community is destroyed.

1343 Pre-Easter massacres spread from Germany across Western Europe. Jews fleeing persecution are welcomed in Poland by Casimir the Great.

1344 The citizens ask the King's permission to confiscate the houses of the Jews for the cities benefit – he grants their request.

1348 European Jews are blamed for the plague in the Black Death persecutions. Charge laid to the Jews that they poisoned the wells. Massacres spread throughout Spain, France, Germany and Austria. More than 200 Jewish communities destroyed by violence. Many communities have been expelled and settle down in Poland.

1349 Basel: 600 Jews burned at the stake, 140 children forcibly baptized, the remaining city's Jews expelled. The city synagogue is turned into a church and the Jewish cemetery is destroyed. 

1349 The Erfurt massacre was a massacre of around 3,000 Jews as a result of Black Death Jewish persecutions

1349 The entire Jewish population of Speyer is destroyed. All Jews are either killed, converted, or fled. All their property and assets was confiscated. Part of the Black Death Jewish persecutions.

1349 600 Jews are burned at the stake and the entire Jewish community of Zurich is annihilated as a part of the Black Death Jewish persecutions.

1349 The Jewish community of Worms is completely destroyed as a result of the Black Death Jewish persecutions. Hundreds of Jews set fire to their homes to avoid the oncoming torture. Their property was seized by the locals.

1349 Jews of Berlin are expelled and many are killed as a part of the Black Death Jewish persecutions.

1349 Jews of Breslau are expelled as part of the Black Death Jewish persecutions.

1349 60 Jews are murdered in Breslau. The city claims all property and synagogues, while the Emperor was given the cemetery and all Jewish debts.

1349 The Jewish quarter of Cologne is destroyed by an angry mob, and the most of the community is killed. All of their property was split up between the ransackers. It was part of the Black Death Jewish persecutions.

1349 The Strasbourg massacre was a part of the Black Death persecutions, where several hundred Jews were publicly burned to death, and the rest of them were expelled. It was one of the first and worst pogroms in pre-modern history.

24 August 1349 6,000 Jews are burned to death in Mainz as a part of the Black Death Jewish persecutions. When the angry mob charged, the Jews initially fought back, killing around 200 of their attackers.

1350 Brussels Jewish community is decimated after they are blamed for the Plague.

1352 Church officials order the expulsion of Jews from Bulgaria for "heretical activity."

1354 12,000 Jews are massacred throughout Spain following a bloody civil war.

1359 Charles V of France allows Jews to return for a period of 20 years in order to pay ransom for his father John II of France, imprisoned in England. The period is later extended beyond the 20 years.

1360 Jews are expelled from Breslau.

1360 Furious with a pogrom against Castilian Jews in Miranda de Ebro, Peter of Castile publicly boils one of the perpetrators, roasts another, and executes others with an axe.

1360 Sephardic Jew Samuel ben Meir Abulafia is arrested and tortured to death in prison for no apparent reason. His lands are confiscated by the king.

1365 Jews of Lorraine are expelled after their presence is cited as the cause of lightning strikes which destroyed twenty-two houses.

1367 Host desecration trials are held against the Jews of Barcelona. They were initiated by the crown prince Don Juan of Aragon.

1368 Some 6,000 Jews are killed during a siege in Toledo.

1370 The entire Jewish population of Brussels is massacred over allegations of host desecration. It was an end of the Hebrew community in Brussels. The event was commemorated by local Christians as the Sacrament of Miracle.

1376 Jews are expelled from Hungary. Most of them flee south into Greece and neighboring areas.

1377 Another Host desecration trial is held against Jews in Teruel and Huesca. The person behind it, as with the previous trial, is the crown prince Don Juan of Aragon. Many Jews are tortured and burned alive publicly.

1382 16 Jews are murdered in the Mailotin Riots.

1384 200 Jews are killed in Noerdlingen and the community ceases to exist.

1386 Wenceslaus, Holy Roman Emperor, expels the Jews from the Swabian League and Strasbourg and confiscates their property.

1385 John of Castile reinforces previous anti-Jewish legislation.

1385 All Jews in the Swabian League are arrested, and their books are confiscated.

1389 18 March, a Jewish boy is accused of plotting against a priest. The mob slaughters approx. 3,000 of Prague's Jews, destroys the city's synagogue and Jewish cemetery. Wenceslaus insists that the responsibility lay with the Jews for going outside during Holy Week.

1391 Anti-Jewish riots led by Ferrand Martinez erupt in Seville.

1391 Led by Ferrand Martinez, countless massacres devastate the Sephardic Jewish community, especially in Castile, Valencia, Catalonia and Aragon. The Jewish quarter in Barcelona is completely destroyed. By the end of the pogroms, at least 10,000 Jews are murdered and thousands more are forcibly converted.

1391 Pogrom against the Jews of Toledo on the Seventeenth of Tammuz. Jewish martyrs Israel Alnaqua and Judah ben Asher died at the stake together.

1391 Over 250 Jews are massacred by a mob in Valencia.

1391 All Jewish inhabitants of Palma, Majorca are either converted or killed.

1391 More than 400 Jews are massacred in Barcelona.

1392 The Jews of Damascus are accused by Muslims of setting fire to the central mosque. Although there was no evidence presented, one Jew was burned alive, the leaders of the community were tortured, and the local synagogue was appropriated into a mosque.

1392 Sicilian Jews are forced to live in Ghettos and severe persecution breaks out in Erice, Catania and Syracuse.

1394 3 November, Charles VI of France expels all Jews from France.

1397 Jewish ghettos across Slovenia are set on fire by an anonymous mob.

1399 A Christian woman is accused of stealing hosts and giving them to Jews for the purpose of desecration. Thirteen members of the Jewish community of Posen, along with the woman are all tortured and burned alive slowly. The community is then forced to pay a special tax every year until the 18th century.

1399 80 Jews are murdered in Prague after a converted Jew named Peter accuses them of denigrating Christianity. A number of Jews are also jailed, including Yom-Tov Lipmann-Muhlhausen.

Fifteenth century 
1401 Two Jews are burned to death for an alleged host desecration in Glogau.

1404 Many members of the Jewish community of Salzburg and Hallein is burned alive on charged of host desecration.

1407 Blood libel accusations against the Jews of Kraków led by a fanatic priest result in anti-Jewish riots.

1411 Oppressive legislation against Jews in Spain as an outcome of the preaching of the Dominican friar Vicente Ferrer.

1413 Disputation of Tortosa, Spain, staged by the Avignon Pope Benedict XIII, is followed by forced mass conversions.

1418 All Jews living in Trier are expelled.

1420 All Jews are expelled from Lyons.

1421 Persecutions of Jews in Vienna, known as Wiener Gesera (Vienna Edict), confiscation of their possessions, and forced conversion of Jewish children. 270 Jews burned at stake.

1421 All Viennese Jews are expelled following persecution.

1422 Pope Martin V issues a Bull reminding Christians that Christianity was derived from Judaism and warns the friars not to incite against the Jews. The Bull was withdrawn the following year on allegations that the Jews of Rome attained it by fraud.

1424 The Jewish population of Zurich is exiled.

1424 Jews are expelled and banned from Cologne.

1426 Jews are expelled from Iglau after they are accused of being in league with the Hussites.

1427 All Jews living in Bern are expelled and their property is seized.

1428 Jews are expelled from Fribourg.

1430 Pogrom in Aix-en-Provence breaks out in which 9 Jews are killed, many more are injured and 74 are forcibly converted.

1434 Council of Basel, Sessio XIX: Jews are forbidden to obtain academic degrees and to act as agents in the conclusion of contracts between Christians.

1435 Massacre and forced conversion of Majorcan Jews.

1435 Jews are expelled from Speyer "forever."

1436 Jews of Zurich are expelled.

1438 Jewish inhabitants of Augsburg and Düsseldorf are expelled.

1438 Establishment of mellahs (ghettos) in Morocco.

1442 Synagogues and other Jewish buildings are destroyed by a riot of Glogau.
 
1442 Jews are expelled from Upper Bavaria.

1444 Jewish population of Utrecht are expelled.

1447 Casimir IV renews all the rights of Jews of Poland and makes his charter one of the most liberal in Europe. He revokes it in 1454 at the insistence of Bishop Zbigniew.

1449 The Statute of Toledo introduces the rule of purity of blood discriminating Conversos. Pope Nicholas V condemns it.

1450 Louis IX, Duke of Bavaria expels all Jews who reject baptism.

1453 Around 40 Jews in Breslau are burned at the stake on charges of host desecration, while the head Rabbi hung himself to avoid the torture. Jewish children under 7 were stolen and forcibly baptized. The few Jews remaining were banished from Breslau.

1456 Pope Caliextus III issues a papal bull which prohibits Jews from testifying against Christians, but permits Christians to testify against a Jew.

1458 The city council of Erfurt, Germany votes to expel the Jews.

1463 Pope Nicholas V authorizes the establishment of the Inquisition to investigate heresy among the Marranos. See also Crypto-Judaism.

1465 The Moroccan revolt against the Marinid dynasty, accusations against one Jewish Vizier lead to a massacre of the entire Jewish population of Fes.

1465 Over 30 Jews in Cracow are killed by an angry mob.

1468 Many Jewish homes and plundered and a number are killed during anti-Jewish in Posen.

1468 Sultan Qaitbay forces Jews of Cairo to pay 75,000 gold pieces or be expelled. This severely impoverished the local Jewish community.

1470 The Jewish community of Bavaria are expelled, many migrate into Bulgaria.

1473 Massacres of Marranos of Valladolid, Cordova, Segovia, Ciudad Real, Spain

1474 On Assumption day 15 August 1474, Christians wreaked brutal havoc on the Jewish dwellers of the Cartellone area of Modica. It was the first and most horrible massacre of Sicilian Jews. During the evening a number of Christians slaughtered about 360 Jews causing a total and fierce devastation in La Giudecca. They ran through the streets chanting: "Hurrah for Mary! Death to the Jews!" (Viva Maria! Morte ai Giudei!).

1475 A student of the preacher Giovanni da Capistrano, Franciscan Bernardine of Feltre, accuses the Jews in murdering an infant, Simon. The entire community is arrested, 15 leaders are burned at the stake, the rest are expelled. In 1588, Pope Sixtus V confirmed Simon's cultus. Saint Simon was considered a martyr and patron of kidnap and torture victims for almost 500 years. In 1965, Pope Paul VI declared the episode a fraud, and decanonized Simon's sainthood.

1478 Jews of Passau are expelled.

1481 The Spanish Inquisition is instituted.

1484 Pogrom against the Jewish section of Arles. A number of Jews are killed and 50 men are forced to convert.

1487–1504 Bishop Gennady exposes the heresy of Zhidovstvuyushchiye (Judaizers) in Eastern Orthodoxy of Muscovy.

1490 Tomás de Torquemada burns 6,000 volumes of Jewish manuscripts in Salamanca.

1490 Jews are expelled from Geneva and not allowed to return for over 300 years.

1491 The blood libel in La Guardia, Spain, where the alleged victim Holy Child of La Guardia became revered as a saint.

1491 Muhammad al-Maghili orders the expulsion and murder of the Jewish community in Tlemcen.

1492 The Jewish population of Tuat is massacred in a pogrom inspired by the preacher al-Maghili.

1492 Ferdinand II and Isabella issue General Edict on the Expulsion of the Jews from Spain: approx. 200,000. Some return to the Land of Israel. As many localities and entire countries expel their Jewish citizens (after robbing them), and others deny them entrance, the legend of the Wandering Jew, a condemned harbinger of calamity, gains popularity.

1492 Jews of Mecklenburg, Germany are accused of stabbing a consecrated wafer. 27 Jews are burned, including two women. The spot is still called the Judenberg. All the Jews are expelled from the Duchy.

1492 Askia Mohammad I decrees that all Jews must convert to Islam, leave or be killed. Judaism becomes illegal in Mali. This was based on the advice of Muhammad al-Maghili. The region of Timbuktu had previously been tolerant of other religions before Askia got into power.

1493 John II of Portugal deports several hundred Jewish children to the colony of São Tomé, where most of them die.

1493 Expulsion from Sicily: approx. 37,000.

1494 16 Jews are burned at the stake after a blood libel in Trnava.

1494 After a fire destroys the Jewish quarter of Cracow, the Polish king Jan I Olbracht transfers the Jews to Kazimierz, which would become the first Polish ghetto. Jews were confined to the ghetto until 1868.

1495 Jews in Lithuania are expelled and their property is seized. They were allowed to return 8 years later.

1495 The Jews of Lecce are massacred and the Jewish quarter is burned to the ground.

1495 The French conquer Naples and persecute the local Jews.

1496 Jews living in Styria are expelled and all their property is confiscated.

1496 Forced conversion and expulsion of Jews from Portugal. This included many who fled Spain four years earlier.

1497 Entire Jewish community of Graz is expelled.

1497 Manuel I of Portugal decrees that all Jews must convert or leave Portugal without their children.

1498 Prince Alexander of Lithuania forces most of the Jews to forfeit their property or convert. The main motivation is to cancel the debts the nobles owe to the Jews. Within a short time trade grinds to a halt and the Prince invites the Jews back in.

1498 French Jews are expelled from most of France.

1499 Jews of Nuremberg are expelled.

1499 Jews are banished from Verona. The Jews who were money lenders were replaced with Christian usurers who oppressed the poor so bad that the Jews were very shortly called to return.

1499 All New Christians are prohibited from leaving Portugal, even those who were forcibly baptized.

Sixteenth century 

1501 French Jews living in Provence are expelled.

1504 Jews living in Pilsen are expelled on charges of host desecration.

1504 Several Jewish scholars are burned at the stake for proselytizing in Moscow.

1505 Ten České Budějovice Jews are tortured and executed after being accused of killing a Christian girl; later, on his deathbed, a shepherd confesses to fabricating the accusation.

1506 A marrano expresses his doubts about miracle visions at St. Dominics Church in Lisbon, Portugal. The crowd, led by Dominican friars, kills him, then ransacks Jewish houses and slaughters any Jew they could find. The countrymen hear about the massacre and join in. Over 2,000 marranos killed in three days.

1509 A converted Jew Johannes Pfefferkorn receives authority of Maximilian I, Holy Roman Emperor to destroy the Talmud and other Jewish religious books, except the Hebrew Bible, in Frankfurt.

1510 Forty Jews are executed in Brandenburg, Germany for allegedly desecrating the host; remainder expelled. 23 November. Less-wealthy Jews expelled from Naples; remainder heavily taxed. 38 Jews burned at the stake in Berlin.

1510 Spanish gain control of Calabria and expel all Jews and New Christians.

1510 Spain gains control of Naples and expels the Jewish population.

1511 The officials of Conegliano try to expel the Jewish population but are unsuccessful.

1511 Eight Roman Catholic converts from Judaism burned at the stake for allegedly reverting.

1511 Most Apulian Jews are either expelled or are tortured to death. Jewish property is seized and Synagogues are replaced with Catholic Churches.

1514 The Jewish population of Mittelberg is accused of host desecration.

1515 Jews are expelled from Laibach.

1515 Jews are expelled from the city of Genoa, but are allowed back in a year later.

1515 Emperor Maximillian expels Jews from Ljubljana.

1516 The first ghetto is established, on one of the islands in Venice.

1517 1517 Hebron attacks: Jews are beaten, raped and killed in Hebron, as their homes and businesses are looted and pillaged.

1517 1517 Safed attacks: The Jews of Safed is attacked by Mamluk forces and local Arabs. Many Jews are killed and their homes are plundered.

1519 The Jewish community of Ratisbon is expelled. The synagogue is destroyed and replaced with a chapel. Thousands of Jewish gravestones are taken and used for buildings.

1519 Martin Luther leads Protestant Reformation and challenges the doctrine of Servitus Judaeorum "... to deal kindly with the Jews and to instruct them to come over to us". 21 February. All Jews expelled from Ratisbon/Regensburg.

1520 Pope Leo X allows the Jews to print the Talmud in Venice.

1523 The conquest of Cranganore by the Portuguese leads to the complete destruction of the local Jewish community. Most refugees fled to Cochin.

1523 Mexico bans immigration from those who can't prove four generations of Catholic ancestry.

1526 Jews are expelled from Hungary, Croatia, and Slovakia following the Battle of Mohács.

1527 Jews are ordered to leave Florence, but the edict is soon rescinded.

1528 Three judaizers are burned at the stake in Mexico City's first auto da fe.

1529 30 Jewish men, women, and children are burned at the stake in Pezinok.

1532 Solomon Molcho is burned at the stake for refusing to return to Catholicism after reverting to Judaism.

1535 After Spanish troops capture Tunis all the local Jews are sold into slavery.

1539 Jews are expelled from Nauheim.

1539 Katarzyna Weiglowa, a Roman Catholic woman from the Kingdom of Poland who converted to Judaism is burned at the stake in Kraków under the charge of apostasy for refusing to call Jesus Christ the Son of God. She is regarded by Jews (among others) as a martyr.

1540 All Jews are banished from Prague.

1542 Moses Fishel of Cracow is accused of proselytizing and dies a martyr.

1543 Jews are exiled from Basel.

1543 Jeronimo Diaz, a New Christian physician, is burned at the stake for holding heretical opinions in Goa, India.

1543 In his pamphlet On the Jews and Their Lies Martin Luther advocates an eight-point plan to get rid of the Jews as a distinct group either by religious conversion or by expulsion:
 "...set fire to their synagogues or schools..."
 "...their houses also be razed and destroyed..."
 "...their prayer books and Talmudic writings... be taken from them..."
 "...their rabbis be forbidden to teach henceforth on pain of loss of life and limb..."
 "...safe-conduct on the highways be abolished completely for the Jews..."
 "...usury be prohibited to them, and that all cash and treasure of silver and gold be taken from them..." and "Such money should now be used in ... the following [way]... Whenever a Jew is sincerely converted, he should be handed [certain amount]..."
 "...young, strong Jews and Jewesses [should]... earn their bread in the sweat of their brow..."
 "If we wish to wash our hands of the Jews' blasphemy and not share in their guilt, we have to part company with them. They must be driven from our country" and "we must drive them out like mad dogs."

 Luther "got the Jews expelled from Saxony in 1537, and in the 1540s he drove them from many German towns; he tried unsuccessfully to get the elector to expel them from Brandenburg in 1543. His followers continued to agitate against the Jews there:  they sacked the Berlin synagogue in 1572 and the following year finally got their way, the Jews being banned from the entire country." (See also Martin Luther and the Jews)

1546 Martin Luther's sermon Admonition against the Jews contains accusations of ritual murder, black magic, and poisoning of wells. Luther recognizes no obligation to protect the Jews.

1547 Ivan the Terrible becomes ruler of Russia and refuses to allow Jews to live in or even enter his kingdom because they "bring about great evil" (quoting his response to request by Polish king Sigismund II).

1547 10 out of the 30 Jews living in Asolo are killed and their houses are robbed.

1550 Dr. Joseph Hacohen is chased out of Genoa for practicing medicine; soon all Jews are expelled.

1553 Pope Julius III forbids Talmud printing and orders burning of any copy found. Rome's Inquisitor-General, Cardinal Carafa (later Pope Paul IV) has Talmud publicly burnt in Rome on Rosh Hashanah, starting a wave of Talmud burning throughout Italy. About 12,000 copies were destroyed.

1554 Cornelio da Montalcino, a Franciscan Friar who converted to Judaism, is burned alive in Rome.

1555 In Papal Bull Cum nimis absurdum, Pope Paul IV writes: "It appears utterly absurd and impermissible that the Jews, whom God has condemned to eternal slavery for their guilt, should enjoy our Christian love." He renews anti-Jewish legislation and installs a locked nightly ghetto in Rome. The Bull also forces Jewish males to wear a yellow hat, females – yellow kerchief. Owning real estate or practicing medicine on Christians is forbidden. It also limits Jewish communities to only one synagogue.

1555 The Martyrs of 1555. 25 Jews in Ancona are hung or burned at the stake for refusing to convert to Christianity as a result of Pope Paul IV's Bull of 1555.

1556 A rumor is sent around that a poor woman in Sokhachev named Dorothy sold Jews the holy wafer received by her during communion, and that it was stabbed until it bled. The Bishop of Khelm accuses the local Jews, and eventually three Jews along with Dorothy Lazhentzka are arrested, put on the rack, and sentenced to death on charges of host desecration. They were burned at the stake. Before their death, the martyred Jews made a declaration: 

1557 Jews are temporarily banished from Prague.

1558 Recanati, Italy: a baptized Jew Joseph Paul More enters synagogue on Yom Kippur under the protection of Pope Paul IV and tries to preach a conversion sermon. The congregation evicts him. Soon after, the Jews are expelled from Recanati.

1559 Pope Pius IV allows Talmud on conditions that it is printed by a Christian and the text is censored.

1560 The Goa Inquisition begins.

1561 Ferdinand I takes an oath to expel the Jews. Mordechai Zemach runs to Rome and convinces Pope Pius IV to cancel the decree.

1563 Russian troops take Polotsk from Lithuania, Jews are given ultimatum: embrace Russian Orthodox Church or die. Around 300 Jewish men, women and children were thrown into ice holes of Dvina river.

1564 Brest-Litovsk: the son of a wealthy Jewish tax collector is accused of killing the family's Christian servant for ritual purposes. He is tortured and executed in line with the law. King Sigismund II of Poland forbids future charges of ritual murder, calling them groundless.

1565 Jews are temporarily banished from Prague.

1566 Antonio Ghislieri elected and, as Pope Pius V, reinstates the harsh anti-Jewish laws of Pope Paul IV. In 1569 he expels Jews dwelling outside of the ghettos of Rome, Ancona, and Avignon from the Papal States, thus ensuring that they remain city-dwellers.

1567 Jews are allowed to live in France.

1569 Pope Pius V expels all the Jews of Bologna. He then gave their cemetery away and commended all Jewish gravestones to be destroyed.

1569 Pope Pius V issues the Bull Hebraeorum gens sola which orders the expulsion of all Jews who refuse to convert.

1571 Jews in Berlin are forced to leave and their property is confiscated.

1571 The Mexican Inquisition begins.

1574 First auto-da-fé in Mexico.

1581 Pope Gregory XIII issues a Bull which prohibits the use of Jewish doctors.

1583 Three Portuguese conversos are burned at the stake in Rome.

1586 Pope Sixtus V forbids printing of the Talmud.

1590 Jewish quarter of Mikulov (Nikolsburg) burns to ground and 15 people die while Christians watch or pillage. King Philip II of Spain orders expulsion of Jews from Lombardy. His order is ignored by local authorities until 1597, when 72 Jewish families are forced into exile.

1591 Philip II, King of Spain, banished all Jews from the duchy of Milan.

1592 Esther Chiera is executed with one of her sons by the Sultan Murad III's calvary.

1593 Pope Clement VIII confirms the Papal bull of Paul III that expels Jews from Papal states except ghettos in Rome and Ancona and issues Caeca et obdurata ("Blind Obstinacy"):  "All the world suffers from the usury of the Jews, their monopolies and deceit. ... Then as now Jews have to be reminded intermittently anew that they were enjoying rights in any country since they left Palestine and the Arabian desert, and subsequently their ethical and moral doctrines as well as their deeds rightly deserve to be exposed to criticism in whatever country they happen to live."

1593 At least 900 are expelled from Bologna.

1595 10 people are accused of practicing Judaism in Lima, Peru. Four of them are released and one named Francisco Rodríguez, is burned alive.

1596 Francisca Nuñez de Carabajal was a Marrana (Jewish convert to Christianity) in New Spain executed by the Inquisition for "judaizing" in 1596. One of her children, Isabel, in her twenties at the time, was tortured until she implicated the whole of the Carabajal family. The whole family was forced to confess and abjure at a public auto-da-fé, celebrated on Saturday, 24 February 1590. Luis de Carabajal the younger (one of Francisca's sons), along with Francisca and four of her daughters, was condemned to perpetual imprisonment, and another one of Francisca's sons, Baltasar, who had fled upon the first warning of danger, was, along with his deceased father Francisco Rodriguez de Matos, burnt in effigy. In January 1595, Francisca and her children were accused of a relapse into Judaism and convicted. During their imprisonment they were tempted to communicate with one another on Spanish pear seeds, on which they wrote touching messages of encouragement to remain true to their faith. At the resulting auto-da-fé, Francisca and her children Isabel, Catalina, Leonor, and Luis, died at the stake, together with Manuel Diaz, Beatriz Enriquez, Diego Enriquez, and Manuel de Lucena. Of her other children, Mariana, who lost her reason for a time, was tried and put to death at an auto-da-fé held in Mexico City on 25 March 1601; Anica, the youngest child, being "reconciled" at the same time.

1598 3 Jews in Lublin are brutally tortured and executed by quartering, after a Christian boy is found in a nearby swamp.

Seventeenth century 
1600 14 Judaizers are punished in Lima, Peru.

1603 Frei Diogo da Assumpcão, a partly Jewish friar who embraced Judaism, burned alive in Lisbon.

1605 16 Judaizers are arrested in Lima, Peru.

1608 The Jesuit order forbids admission to anyone descended from Jews to the fifth generation, a restriction lifted in the 20th century. Three years later Pope Paul V applies the rule throughout the Church, but his successor revokes it.

1612 The Hamburg Senate decides to officially allow Jews to live in Hamburg on the condition there is no public worship.

1614 Vincent Fettmilch, who called himself the "new Haman of the Jews", leads a raid on Frankfurt synagogue that turned into an attack which destroyed the whole community.

1615 King Louis XIII of France decrees that all Jews must leave the country within one month on pain of death.

1615 The Guild led by Dr. Chemnitz, "non-violently" forced the Jews from Worms.

1616 Jesuits arrive in Grodno and accuse the Jews of host desecration and blood libel.

1618 Anti-semitic pamphlet Mirror of the Polish Crown is published by professor Sebastian Miczyński. It accuses the Jews of murder, sacrileges, witchcraft, and urges their expulsion. It would go on to inspire anti-Jewish riots across Poland.

1619 Shah Abbasi of the Persian Sufi Dynasty increases persecution against the Jews, forcing many to outwardly practice Islam. Many keep practicing Judaism in secret.

1622 King Christian IV invites Jews to come and live in Denmark.

1624 Ghetto established in Ferrara, Italy.

1624 Christian theologian Antonio Homem is burned at the stake for pursuing Judaism.

1625 Jews of Vienna forced to live in a ghetto in Leopoldstadt.

1628 Roman Jewish mistress of the son of the duke of Parma is burned alive.

1630 Jewish merchant Moses the Braider is burned alive after being accused of host desecration.

1631 Due to awful conditions in the Jewish Ghetto of Padua, 421 out of the 721 Jews living in the ghetto perish.

1632 King Ladislaus IV of Poland forbids antisemitic books and printings.

1632 Shortly after Miguel Rodriguez is discovered holding onto Jewish rites, an Auto-da-fé is held in the presence of the King and Queen. Miguel and his wife Isabel Alvarez, and 5 others are burned alive publicly.

1632, 20 April Jewish-convert and martyr Nicolas Antoine is burned at the stake for heresy.

1633 Jews are banned from Radom.

1635 Anti-Jewish riots take place in Vilna.

1637 Four Jews are publicly tortured and executed in Kraków.

1639 Over 60 Judaizers are burned at the stake at an Auto-da-fé in Lima, Peru. Among those martyred was physician Francisco Maldonado de Silva.

1639 Two Roman Jewish children are forcibly baptized by Pope Urban VIII.

1639 Jews of Lenchitza are accused of ritual murder after a young child is found dead in the woods. The blame falls on the Jews after a local gentile named Foma confesses to the crime then says he had been coerced into doing it by the Jews. Despite the lack of evidence, two Jewish elders named Meyer and Lazar are arrested and tortured, and eventually quartered publicly.

1644 Jewish martyr Judah the Believer is burned at the stake as he recites prayers in Hebrew.

1647 Jewish martyr Isaac de Castro Tartas is burned at the stake while he recites the Shema along with 6 other Jews.

1648–1655 The Ukrainian Cossacks led by Bohdan Chmielnicki massacre about 100,000 Jews and similar number of Polish nobles, 300 Jewish communities destroyed.

1649 Largest Auto-da-fé in the New World. 109 victims, 13 were burned alive and 57 in effigy.

1655 Oliver Cromwell readmits Jews to England.

1656 All Jews are expelled from Isfahan because of the common belief of their impurity. The ones who don't are forced to convert to Islam.

1657–1662 Jews throughout Iran (including 7,000 in Kashan alone) are forced to convert to Islam as a result of persecutions by Abbas II of Persia.

1661 Sephardic poet Antonio Enríquez Gómez is publicly burned in effigy in Seville.

1663 Two Christian Janissaries accuse the Jews of Istanbul of killing a child who had actually been killed by his own father. After killing his own son, he threw his body onto the Jewish quarter in order to implicate the Jews in the crime. Once the Grand Vizier learned the facts of the case from his spies stationed in the Greek quarter, he informed the Sultan and the Janissaries were put to death. 20 Jews were killed in total by the Greek mobs.

1664 May Jews of Lemberg (now Lvov) ghetto organize self-defense against impending assault by students of Jesuit seminary and Cathedral school. The militia sent by the officials to restore order, instead joined the attackers. About 100 Jews killed.

1669 The majority of Jews in Oran are expelled.

1670 Jews expelled from Vienna.

1670 Raphael Levy is burned at the stake over blood libel. After being offered a chance to convert and live, he declared that he had lived a Jew and would die a Jew.

1679 The Exile of Mawza. It is considered the single most traumatic event experienced collectively by the Jews of Yemen. All Jews living in nearly all cities and towns throughout Yemen were banished by decree of the king, Imām al-Mahdi Ahmad, and sent to a dry and barren region of the country named Mawza to withstand their fate or to die. Only a few communities who lived in the far eastern quarters of Yemen were spared this fate by virtue of their Arab patrons who refused to obey the King's orders. Many would die along the route and while confined to the hot and arid conditions of this forbidding terrain.

1680 Auto-da-fé in Madrid.

1681 Mob attacks against Jews in Vilna. It was condemned by King John Sobieski, who ordered the punishment of the guilty.

1682 Largest trial against alleged Judaizers in Lisbon, Portugal. 117 were tried in 3 days.

1683 Hungarian rebels known as Kuruc rushes into the town of Uherský Brod, massacring the majority of its Jewish inhabitants. Most of the victims were recent refugees who were expelled from Vienna in 1670. One of the Hebrews killed by the mob was Jewish historian Nathan ben Moses Hannover, who was a survivor of the Chmielnicki massacres. Most of the survivors fled to Upper Hungary.

1684 Attack on the Jewish ghetto of Buda.

1686 Only 500 Jews survive after Austrian sieged the city of Buda. Half of them are sold into slavery.

1689 Worms is invaded by the French and the Jewish quarter is reduced to ashes.

1689 The Jewish Ghetto of Prague is destroyed by French troops. After it was over 318 houses, 11 synagogues, and 150 Jews were dead.

1691 219 people are convicted of being Jewish in Palma, Majorca. 37 of them are burned to death.  Among those martyred is Raphael and his sister Catalina Benito, who although declaring she wanted to live, jumped right into the flames rather than to be baptized.

1696 A number of Converso Jews are burned alive in Évora, Portugal.

1698 A female child is found dead at a church in Sandomierz. The mother of the child first said she placed her body in the church because she could not afford a burial, but after torture accused the Jewish leader Aaron Berek of the local community of murdering her daughter. The mother and Berek were sentenced the death.

1699 A mob attacks the Jewish Quarter of Bamberg but runs away after one Jew stops them by pouring baskets of ripe plums on the attackers. The event is still commemorated on the 29th of Nisan as the Zwetschgen-Ta’anit (Prune-Fest).

Eighteenth century 
1703 The Aleinu prayer is prohibited in most of Germany.

1706 After a plague hits Algeria which pushes the Jewish community into poverty, the local ruler decides the plague was caused by the Jews and orders their expulsion. Property is confiscated, synagogues are destroyed, until a sum is paid which further impoverishes the Jews of Algiers.

1711 Johann Andreas Eisenmenger writes his Entdecktes Judenthum ("Judaism Unmasked"), a work denouncing Judaism and which had a formative influence on modern antisemitic polemics.

1712 Blood libel in Sandomierz and expulsion of the town's Jews.

1715 Elector Max Emanuel orders the deportation of all Jews living in Bavaria.

1717 All Jews living in Gibraltar are expelled.

1718 The last Jews of Carniola, Styria and Carinthia are expelled.

1720 Arab creditors set fire to an Ashkenazi synagogue, fed up with debts. Ashkenazic Jews are banned from Jerusalem along with anyone who looks like an Ashkenazi Jew. Some Ashkenazim dressed up like Sephardic Jews in order to fool the authorities.

1721 Maria Barbara Carillo was burned at the stake for heresy during the Spanish Inquisition. She was executed at the age of 95 or 96 and is the oldest person known to have been executed at the instigation of the Inquisition. Carillo was sentenced to death for heresy for returning to her faith in Judaism.

1724 Jews of Radom are exiled.

1727 Edict of Catherine I of Russia: "The Jews... who are found in Ukraine and in other Russian provinces are to be expelled at once beyond the frontiers of Russia."

17341736: The Haidamaks, paramilitary bands in Polish Ukraine, attack Jews.

1736 María Francisca Ana de Castro, called La bella toledana, a Spanish immigrant to Peru, was arrested in 1726, accused of "judaizing" (being a practicing Jew). She was burned at the stake after an auto de fe in 1736. This event was a major spectacle in Lima, but it raised questions about possible irregular procedures and corruption within the Inquisition.

1737 Blood libel in Jarosław leads to Jews being tortured and others being put to death.

1742 Elizabeth of Russia issues a decree of expulsion of all the Jews out of Russian Empire. Her resolution to the Senate's appeal regarding harm to the trade: "I don't desire any profits from the enemies of Christ". One of the deportees is Antonio Ribera Sanchez, her own personal physician and the head of army's medical dept.

1743 The Russians gain control of Riga and all local Jews are expelled.

1744 Frederick II The Great (a "heroic genius", according to Hitler) limits Breslau to ten "protected" Jewish families, on the grounds that otherwise they will "transform it into complete Jerusalem". He encourages this practice in other Prussian cities. In 1750 he issues Revidiertes General Privilegium und Reglement vor die Judenschaft: "protected" Jews had an alternative to "either abstain from marriage or leave Berlin" (Simon Dubnow).

1744  Archduchess of Austria Maria Theresa orders: "... no Jew is to be tolerated in our inherited duchy of Bohemia" by the end of Feb. 1745. In December 1748 she reverses her position, on condition that Jews pay for readmission every ten years. This extortion was known among the Jews as malke-geld (queen's money). In 1752 she introduces the law limiting each Jewish family to one son.

1746 The city of Radom bans Jews from entering.

1753 The Jewish community of Kaunas is expelled.

1755 Jeronimo Jose Ramos, a merchant from Bragança, Portugal, is burned at the stake for being secretly Jewish.

1761 Several Jews from Alsace are executed after being accused of host desecration.

1761 The Jews of Kaunas are expelled after anti-Jewish riots.

1762 Rhode Island refuses to grant Jews citizenship stating "no person who is not of the Christian religion can be admitted free to this colony."

1766 All but 6 Jews are expelled from Toruń.

1768 Haidamaks massacre the Jews of Uman, Ukraine.

1775 Pope Pius VI issues a severe Editto sopra gli ebrei (Edict concerning the Jews). Previously lifted restrictions are reimposed, Judaism is suppressed.

1776 The Jewish community of Basra is massacred.

1782 Holy Roman Emperor Joseph II abolishes most of persecution practices in Toleranzpatent on condition that Yiddish and Hebrew are eliminated from public records and judicial autonomy is annulled. Judaism is branded "quintessence of foolishness and nonsense". Moses Mendelssohn writes: "Such a tolerance... is even more dangerous play in tolerance than open persecution".

1783 The Sultan expels the Moroccan Jews for failing to pay an exorbitant ransom.

1785 Ali Burzi Pasha murders hundreds of Libyan Jews.

1786 Jews are expelled from Jeddah, most of them flee to Yemen.

1790 Yazid becomes the Sultan of Morocco and immediately orders troops to massacre and plunder the Jewish quarter of Tétouan.

1790 The Touro Synagogue's warden, Moses Seixas, wrote to George Washington, expressing his support for Washington's administration and good wishes for him. Washington sent a letter in response, which read in part: 

There is an annual event reading Washington's letter, and speakers at the annual event have included Supreme Court Justices Ruth Bader Ginsburg and Elena Kagan; and Brown University Presidents Ruth Simmons and Christina Paxson.

1790, 20 May Eleazer Solomon is quartered for the alleged murder of a Christian girl in Grodno.

1790–1792 Destruction of most of the Jewish communities of Morocco.

1791 Catherine II of Russia confines Jews to the Pale of Settlement and imposes them with double taxes.

1797 Napoleon calls for the end of Jewish segregation, ghettoization and the denial of equal rights.

Nineteenth century

Twentieth century

Twenty-first century

See also 
 Martyrdom in Judaism
 Timeline of anti-Zionism
 Timeline of Jewish history
 Timeline of the Holocaust
 Vichy Holocaust collaboration timeline
 Timeline of the Arab–Israeli conflict
 Timeline of the Israeli–Palestinian conflict
 Expulsions and exoduses of Jews
 Jewish refugees
 Persecution of Jews

References

External links 
 International Religious Freedom Report for 2012—A Continued Rise in Anti-Semitism, a report by the U.S. Bureau of Democracy, Human Rights, and Labo

History of antisemitism
Antisemitism